The Agariya language is a spurious language said to be spoken by the Agariya people, a community found in northern Chhattisgarh and eastern Madhya Pradesh. It is a Munda language. Although recorded in Ethnologue with an ISO code, the language is declared as 'spurious' by Glottolog and its existence was explicitly denied by noted scholar of tribal traditions Verrier Elwin, and more recently by linguist Felix Rau and Paul Sidwell. This was primarily due to suspicions of the conflating of various different 'Agariya' tribes with different dialects. Moreover, no Munda languages are attested in the upper Gangetic Plain in recent history.

References

Munda languages
spurious languages